David Gomez Pimenta (born September 5, 1988 in São Paulo) is a Brazilian-Israeli association football player who currently plays for Beitar Kfar Saba in Liga Bet.

Honours
Liga Leumit:
Runner-up (2): 2010-11, 2013–14
Liga Alef:
Winner (1): 2015-16

External links

1988 births
Living people
Israeli footballers
Hapoel Jerusalem F.C. players
Beitar Jerusalem F.C. players
Maccabi Netanya F.C. players
Hapoel Rishon LeZion F.C. players
Hapoel Acre F.C. players
Hapoel Petah Tikva F.C. players
Maccabi Ahi Nazareth F.C. players
Hapoel Afula F.C. players
Maccabi Sha'arayim F.C. players
Ironi Nesher F.C. players
Nordia Jerusalem F.C. players
Beitar Kfar Saba F.C. players
Liga Leumit players
Israeli Premier League players
Brazilian emigrants to Israel
Association football forwards